Martha M. Zweig (born April 2, 1942, in Philadelphia, Pennsylvania) is an American poet. Her most recent book is Monkey Lightning (Tupelo Press, 2010).

Life
She was raised in Moorestown Township, New Jersey, where she attended the Quaker Moorestown Friends School. She earned her B.A. and an M.A.and a Hopwood Award from the University of Michigan; and an M.F.A. from Warren Wilson College. She  lives in Hardwick, Vermont, and volunteers for North Country Animal League, and for Restorative Justice.

Her poems have appeared in literary journals and magazines including The Beloit Poetry Journal, Boston Review, Conduit, Field, Gettysburg Review, Indiana Review, The Journal, The Kenyon Review, Literary Imagination, Manoa, Notre Dame Review, New Orleans Review, The North American Review, Northwest Review, Paris Review, The Progressive, Willow Springs.

Honors and awards
 1999 Whiting Award

Published works
Full-Length Poetry Collections
 Monkey Lightning (Tupelo Press, 2010)

Chapbooks

References

External links
Profile at The Whiting Foundation
Interview: Art One > Vol. 2, No. 1, Summer 1996 > Interview with Martha Zweig by Ruth Armstrong
Poem: "Featured Poet: Martha Zweig", Perihelion
Author Page: Tupelo Press > Martha Zweig Bio
Poems: "Intelligence"; "Chain Letter"; "The Particulars"; "Bad Fish"; "Spared"; "The Fleet", Boston Review, 23.1
Poems: webdelsol (from Perihelion) > Poems by Martha Zweig > "Freshet"; "Outfit"; "Portrait"; "Untenable"; "Green Velvet"; "Brainwash"; "Midsummer Marital With Creosote Bush & Tattoo "; "Luminary"; "Cross-Country"; "Paternoster"
Poems: "Provisions", Virginia Quarterly Review, Spring 2000
Poems: "Migraine", The Gettysburg Review, Spring 2001

Ploughshares
 Poem: 
Poem: 

1942 births
Living people
Poets from New Jersey
American women poets
Moorestown Friends School alumni
People from Caledonia County, Vermont
People from Moorestown, New Jersey
University of Michigan alumni
Warren Wilson College alumni
Writers from Vermont